Progressive People's Party may refer to:

Progressive People's Party (Germany), in the late German Empire
Progressive People's Party (Ghana)
Progressive People's Party (Liberia)
Progressive People's Party (Namibia)
Progressive People's Party (Molise)

See also
People's Progressive Party (disambiguation)
Progressive Party (disambiguation)